The discography of Spiderbait consists of seven studio albums, two compilation album, twelve EPs, and twenty-four singles.

Albums

Studio albums

Compilation albums

Extended plays

Singles

Promotional singles

Other appearances
 "Shazam!" featured in an episode of season four of Sex and the City
 "(Ghost) Riders in the Sky" featured in the end credits of Ghost Rider
 "Glockenpop" featured in the PSP version of the game LittleBigPlanet in 2009
 "Rock-a-Bye Your Bear" on ReWiggled - A Tribute to the Wiggles (2011)

References

Rock music group discographies
Discographies of Australian artists